Menopon is a genus of lice belonging to the family Menoponidae.

The species of this genus are found in Europe, Northern America, Southwestern Asia.

Species:
Menopon carrikeri 
Menopon clayae 
Menopon deryloi 
Menopon ferrisi 
Menopon gallinae 
Menopon hamatum 
Menopon hopkinsi 
Menopon interpositum 
Menopon jellisoni 
Menopon kuntzi 
Menopon pallens 
Menopon sigialitidis 
Menopon spinulosum 
Menopon subgallinae 
Menopon truncatum

References

Lice
Insect genera
Taxa named by Christian Ludwig Nitzsch